Bueche is an unincorporated community located in West Baton Rouge Parish, Louisiana, United States.

References

Unincorporated communities in West Baton Rouge Parish, Louisiana
Unincorporated communities in Louisiana